Lorenzo Campeggi (died 1639) was a Roman Catholic prelate who served as Bishop of Senigallia (1628–1639), Apostolic Nuncio to Spain (1634–1639), Apostolic Nuncio to Savoy (1624–1627), and Bishop of Cesena (1623–1628).

Biography
On 8 December 1623, Lorenzo Campeggi was appointed during the papacy of Pope Urban VIII as Bishop of Cesena.
On 21 January 1624, he was consecrated bishop by Ottavio Bandini, Cardinal-Bishop of Palestrina, with Pietro Dini, Archbishop of Fermo, and Antonio Díaz (bishop), Bishop of Caserta, serving as co-consecrators. 
On 23 March 1624, he was appointed during the papacy of Pope Urban VIII as Apostolic Nuncio to Savoy where he served until his resignation on 3 July 1627.
On 11 December 1628, he was appointed during the papacy of Pope Urban VIII as Bishop of Senigallia.
On 31 January 1634, he was appointed during the papacy of Pope Urban VIII as Apostolic Nuncio to Spain; he served until his resignation on 8 August 1639.
He served as Bishop of Senigallia until his death on 9 August 1639.

References

External links and additional sources
 (for Chronology of Bishops) 
 (for Chronology of Bishops) 
 (for Chronology of Bishops) 
 
 
 (for Chronology of Bishops) 
 (for Chronology of Bishops) 

17th-century Italian Roman Catholic bishops
Bishops appointed by Pope Urban VIII
1639 deaths
Apostolic Nuncios to Savoy